Phalacrocarpum is a genus of plants in the chamomile tribe within the daisy family, native to the Iberian Peninsula.

 Species
 Phalacrocarpum oppositifolium (Brot.) Willk. - Spain, Portugal
 Phalacrocarpum sericeum Henriq. - Spain, Portugal
 Phalacrocarpum victoriae Sennen & Elias - Spain

References

Flora of Southwestern Europe
Asteraceae genera
Anthemideae